Big Brother 2 is the second season of various versions of Big Brother and may refer to:

 Big Brother 2 (Netherlands), the 2000 edition of the Dutch version of Big Brother
 Big Brother Germany (season 2), the 2000 version of the German edition of Big Brother
 Gran Hermano Argentina (season 2), the 2001 edition of the Argentinian version of Big Brother
 Grande Fratello (season 2), the 2001 edition of the Italian version of Big Brother
 Gran Hermano Spain (season 2), the 2001 edition of the Spanish version of Big Brother
 Big Brother 2 (UK), the 2001 edition of the UK version of Big Brother
 Big Brother 2 (U.S.), the 2001 edition of the U.S. version of Big Brother
 Big Brother 2 (Australia), the 2002 Australian edition of Big Brother
 Big Brother Brasil 2, the 2002 edition of the Brazilian version of Big Brother
 Big Brother 2 (Greece), the 2002 Greek edition of Big Brother
 Big Brother 2 (Romania), the 2004 edition of the Romanian of Big Brother
 Big Brother 2 (Bulgaria), the 2005 Bulgarian edition of Big Brother
 Big Brother 2 (Croatia), the 2005 Croatian edition of Big Brother
 Big Brother 2006 (Finland), the 2006 edition of the Finnish edition of Big Brother
 Loft Story (Canada season 2), the 2006 of the French-Canadian version of Big Brother
 Big Brother Thailand (season 2), the 2006 edition of the Thai version Big Brother
 Big Brother Africa (season 2), the 2007 edition of the African version of Big Brother
 Pinoy Big Brother (season 2), the 2007 edition of Big Brother in the Philippines
 Veliki brat 2007, the 2007 edition of Big Brother in Serbia, Bosnia and Herzegovina, and Montenegro
 Secret Story 2 (France), the 2008 edition of the French version of Big Brother
 Bigg Boss (season 2), the 2008 edition of the Indian version of Big Brother
 Big Brother 2 (Slovenia), the 2008 edition of the Slovenian version Big Brother
 Big Brother 2 (Albania), the 2009 edition of the Albanian version of Big Brother
 HaAh HaGadol 2, the 2009–2010 edition of the Israeli version of Big Brother
 Secret Story 2 (Portugal), the 2011 edition of Big Brother in Portugal
 Big Brother 2 (Canada), the English-Canadian 2014 edition of Big Brother

See also
 Big Brother (franchise)
 Big Brother (disambiguation)